Janeen Brian (born 1948), is a South Australian writer of children's books. A primary school teacher prior to 1990, when she started writing full time, she published her 100th book in September, 2016. Look, Baby! won the 2021 Speech Pathology Book of the Year for Birth to three years.

Works

Children's books
 Oddball (2008)
 I'm A Dirty Dinosaur (2013) Penguin Books 
 I’m A Hungry Dinosaur (2015) Penguin Books

References

External links

 

1948 births
Living people
Australian children's writers
Australian women children's writers